Roman Davidovich Timenchik (in Russian Рома́н Дави́дович Тиме́нчик, in Latvian Romāns Timenčiks, in Hebrew, ‏רומן טימנצ'יק, born in Riga on 3 December 1945) is a Soviet and Israeli literary critic and a researcher on Russian literature of the 20th century.

He studied at the Faculty of Philology of the University of Latvia. He participated in the seminars of Professor Juri Lotman at the University of Tartu, took part in the Summer School on secondary modeling systems. After graduating from university in 1967, he worked as the head of the literary section of the Riga Young Spectator's Theatre (1968-1991). From 1970 to 1989, he lectured on the history of Russian literature and theater at the Theater Faculty of the Jāzeps Vītols Latvian Academy of Music.
In 1982 he defended his dissertation on “The Artistic Principles of Anna Akhmatova’s Pre-Revolutionary Poetry” at the University of Tartu. He has been the compiler and commentator of a number of publications on Anna Akhmatova, Ivan Bunin, Nikolay Gumilyov, Osip Mandelstam, Vladimir Nabokov, Vladimir Piast and a member of the editorial board and author of articles in the biographical dictionary "Russian Writers 1800-1917" ("Russkie pisateli 1800-1917"). From 1988 to 1991, he was a member of the editorial board of the publication "Literary Heritage" ("Literaturnoe nasledstvo").

In 1991 he moved to Israel. Since March 1991, he has been a professor at the Hebrew University of Jerusalem. As a visiting professor, he lectured at the University of California. One of the founders (1999) and a member of the editorial board of the "Jerusalem Journal" ("Ierusalimski Zhurnal"). Member of the editorial board of Russian magazines "New Literary Review" ("Novoe literaturnoe obozrenie") and "New Russian Book" ("Novaja russkaja kniga").

In 2006, he was awarded the Andrei Bely Prize in the category “Humanitarian Studies” for the book “Anna Akhmatova in the 1960s” (М.; Toronto: Volodej Publishers; Toronto University Press, 2005).

His main area of research is the history of Acmeist poetry. His first scientific work “Toward an Analysis of A. Akhmatova's Poem without a Hero” was published as a student in the collection “Materials of the 22nd Scientific Conference” (Tartu, 1967). He studied the works of Akhmatova, Gumilyov, Mandelstam, Blok, Annensky and their literary and creative environment.

He also studied the works of  Alexander Pushkin, Vladimir Nabokov, Joseph Brodsky. He is the author of many articles in literary magazines and collections of scientific articles, most of which are devoted to Russian poetry of the Silver Age.

References 

 Роман Тименчик — Журнальный зал
 Синие листья Гумилева
 Мир Иннокентия Анненского: Р. Д. Тименчик, персональная страница
 
 Роман Тименчик: «Те, кто не понимает, что б/п – это беспартийный, пусть читают облегченную биографию Ахматовой» — OpenSpace.ru
 Роман Тименчик: «Наша профессия — объяснять утраченные смыслы» • Arzamas

External links 
 Роман Тименчик: «Наша профессия — объяснять утраченные смыслы» • Arzamas
 
 
 
 

 
1945 births
Living people
Soviet academics
Soviet emigrants to Israel
Academic staff of the Hebrew University of Jerusalem
University of Latvia alumni
University of Tartu alumni
Soviet literary critics
Israeli literary critics
Academic staff of Jāzeps Vītols Latvian Academy of Music